K. Ramakrishna (born 16 January 1957) is an Indian politician and leader of Communist Party of India (CPI). He was elected as a member of Andhra Pradesh Legislative Assembly from Anantaptur in 1994. He elected as secretary of CPI Andhra Pradesh State Council in May 2014.

References

Communist Party of India politicians from Andhra Pradesh
Living people
1957 births
Andhra Pradesh MLAs 1994–1999